The Complete Warner Bros.–Seven Arts Recordings is a double CD compilation of songs by American jazz pianist/composer Vince Guaraldi released by Omnivore Recordings on July 6, 2018. It contains 30 tracks, containing remastered versions of Guaraldi's complete recorded output for Warner Bros.-Seven Arts (Oh Good Grief!, The Eclectic Vince Guaraldi, Alma-Ville), plus four bonus tracks.

Background
Vince Guaraldi's final three albums released during his lifetime were recorded for Warner Bros.-Seven Arts after spending considerable time struggling to extricate himself from Fantasy Records. Warner signed Guaraldi to a three-record deal, and insisted that his inaugural release consist of his Peanuts songs. This was done in part to help fill the void left by a lack of soundtrack albums to accompany the successful television specials, Charlie Brown's All Stars!, It's the Great Pumpkin, Charlie Brown, You're in Love, Charlie Brown and He's Your Dog, Charlie Brown. Guaraldi responded with new renditions of eight of his most popular scores from those programs on his first release, Oh Good Grief!.

Guaraldi was then given complete artistic control over his sophomore, self-produced Warner effort, The Eclectic Vince Guaraldi, resulting in an unfocused and overindulgent album that was not well received by both critics and consumers. At Warner's insistence, arranger Shorty Rogers was recruiter to produce Guaraldi's final album, Alma-Ville. Though deemed a focused improvement over the previous album, Warner lost interest in Guaraldi and did not promote the album. Both The Eclectic Vince Guaraldi and Alma-Ville fell into obscurity, with Oh Good Grief! remaining in print and a steady seller due to the perpetual popularity of the Peanuts franchise.

Production
The Complete Warner Bros.–Seven Arts Recordings was compiled by prestige label Omnivore Recordings and produced by Grammy Award-winning Cheryl Pawelski. Pawelski recruited audio archivist Michael Graves (who worked on previous Guaraldi remastering efforts) to perform a high-definition 24-bit mix.

In addition to a double-CD release, Oh, Good Grief! was issued on translucent red vinyl.

Track listings 
All tracks written by Vince Guaraldi, except where noted.

Disc One

Disc Two

Personnel
Credits adapted from CD liner notes.
Oh, Good Grief
Vince Guaraldi – piano, electric harpsichord
Eddie Duran – guitar
Stanley Gilbert – double bass
Carl Burnett – drums

The Eclectic Vince Guaraldi
Vince Guaraldi – piano, electric harpsichord, guitar, lead vocals 
Eddie Duran, Robert Addison – guitars
Bob Maize, Jim McCabe – electric bass
Peter Marshall – bass
Gerald Granelli, Al Coster – drums
Gloria Strassner, Jesse Ehrlich – cello

Alma-Ville
 Vince Guaraldi – piano, guitar
 Herb Ellis – guitar 
 Eddie Duran – guitar 
 Monty Budwig – bass 
 Kelly Bryan – bass 
 Sebastião Neto – electric bass 
 Dom Um Romão – drums 
 Colin Bailey – drums 
 Al Coster – drums 
 Rubens Bassini – percussion 

Bonus tracks
 Vince Guaraldi – piano
 Eddie Duran – guitar 
 Peter Marshall – bass 
 Bob Belanski – drums 
Additional musicians for Disc 2, Tracks 1 and 2 are unknown.

References

2018 albums
Warner Records albums
Cool jazz compilation albums
Vince Guaraldi albums
Vince Guaraldi compilation albums
Mainstream jazz compilation albums
Albums arranged by Vince Guaraldi
Peanuts music